The International Society for Pharmacoepidemiology (ISPE) is a society focused on the practice of pharmacoepidemiology.

The society was launched officially by Stanley A. Edlavitch, David E. Lilienfeld, and Hugh A. Tilson in 1989 during the Fifth International Conference on Pharmacoepidemiology (ICPE) in Minneapolis.

ISPE is the only international acting society dealing with the topics of pharmacoepidemiology in the context of pharmacovigilance or drug safety; the International Society for Pharmacoeconomics and Outcomes Research (ISPOR) addresses outcomes research epidemiology. The society has organized yearly conferences since its foundation. The society's office is located in Bethesda, Maryland, and its executive secretary is James Vrac. A number of the major figures in drug safety and pharmacovigilance have served as its Presidents, and its Officers and Trustees have been drawn from the leadership of the pharmacoepidemiology community.  Members of the Society come from 53 nations and mostly come from academia, pharmaceutical industry, Contract Research Organizations and governmental institutions (e.g., U.S. Food and Drug Administration, National Institutes of Health, EMA, BfArM, Robert Koch Institute (RKI)) acting as drug regulators. The official journal of the society is Pharmacoepidemiology and Drug Safety which is indexed in MEDLINE and the regularly edited newsletter Scribe is available on the above-mentioned website of ISPE. (The original Society newsletter was the PharmacoEpidemiology Newsletter (PEN), created by Stanley A. Edlavitch (edited by Edlavitch and David E. Lilienfeld) in 1985.  In 1992, the Society returned the PEN to Edlavitch.) The current president of the society is Almut G. Winterstein from the College of Pharmacy, University of Florida, USA. The  36. ICPE-Meeting, planned for 26. to 30. of August at the Estrel-Hotel in Berlin, Germany has been cancelled due to the pandemic corona-times. Instead a virtual conference was planned. The 37. ICPE-Meeting is planned for 21. to 25. of August 2021 in Seattle, Washington, USA.

The ISPE is directed by a structured Board of Trustees, ensuring that each of its various constituencies has some voice within the organization. The major areas within which pharmacoepidemiology is practiced (industry, government, academia) provides the framework for the three forums within which ISPE members may raise items for discussion by the ISPE Board.

References

External links
 

Epidemiology organizations
Pharmaceuticals policy
Organizations established in 1989
Companies based in Bethesda, Maryland